Jack Frusciante Left the Band is a 1996 Italian teen drama film  directed by Enza Negroni. It is based on Enrico Brizzi's bestseller Jack Frusciante Has Left the Band.

Cast 

Stefano Accorsi: Alex
Violante Placido: Adelaide / Aidi
Alessandro Zamattio: Martino 
Barbara Livi: Valentina
Andrea Manai: Tony
Riccardo Pedrazzoli: Rocco  
Stefano Rivi: Nardini
Angela Baraldi: Caterina
Simone Sabattini: Hoge
Ivano Marescotti: Father of Alex  
Athina Cenci: Mother of Alex

References

External links

1996 films
Italian drama films
1990s teen drama films
1996 directorial debut films
1996 drama films
1990s Italian-language films
1990s Italian films
Films based on Italian novels